The 2018–19 season was Crystal Palace's sixth consecutive season in the Premier League (extending their longest ever spell in the top division of English football) and the 113th year in their history. In this season, Palace participated in the Premier League, FA Cup and EFL Cup.
The season covers the period from 1 July 2018 to 30 June 2019.

Players

Friendlies
The club had a pre-season tour to Scandinavia to play FC Helsingør and Halmstads BK, first-team friendlies away against Oxford United and Reading, and at home to Toulouse, as well as Palace XI (mixture of first-team and Under-23s) fixtures against Bromley, Stevenage, Boreham Wood and Kingstonian.

Competitions

Premier League

League table

Results summary

Results by matchday

Matches
On 14 June 2018, the Premier League fixtures for the forthcoming season were announced.

FA Cup

In the third round draw, made on 3 December 2018, Palace were drawn at home to League Two team Grimsby Town. They won through a late Jordan Ayew goal after Grimsby had a man sent off, and in the draw for the next round were paired with fellow Premier League team Tottenham Hotspur. Palace won 2–0 against Spurs, earning an away tie against League One team Doncaster Rovers in the fifth round. The draw for the quarter-final was made on 18 February.

EFL Cup

Crystal Palace entered the competition in the second round, where they were drawn against Swansea City. The third round draw was made on 30 August 2018, where Palace were drawn to play away against West Brom. The fourth round draw was on 29 September with Crystal Palace again drawn away, this time to Middlesbrough. Palace lost the game to a goal in first-half injury time.

Player statistics

Appearances and goals

|-
! colspan=14 style=background:#DCDCDC; text-align:center| Goalkeepers

|-
! colspan=14 style=background:#DCDCDC; text-align:center| Defenders

|-
! colspan=14 style=background:#DCDCDC; text-align:center| Midfielders

|-
! colspan=14 style=background:#DCDCDC; text-align:center| Forwards

|-
! colspan=14 style=background:#DCDCDC; text-align:center| Left club during season

|}

Goalscorers

Disciplinary record

Transfers

Transfers in

Loans in

Transfers out

Loans out

References

Crystal Palace F.C. seasons
Crystal Palace
Crystal Palace
Crystal Palace